Richard Brooks Orpik (born September 26, 1980) is an American former professional ice hockey defenseman who played for the Pittsburgh Penguins and the Washington Capitals of the National Hockey League (NHL). A stay-at-home defenseman and locker room leader, Orpik is a two-time Stanley Cup champion, winning with the Penguins in 2009 and with the Capitals in 2018 (the only player to win with both teams). 

He serves as an assistant coach of the Boston College Eagles under Jerry York in the NCAA. Orpik is also a member in the player development department for the Washington Capitals, where his role is to work with defensive prospects playing for the Hershey Bears.

Early life
Orpik was born in San Francisco,  a few months after the U.S. "Miracle on Ice" win over the Soviet Union in Lake Placid, New York, in 1980. Due to this, he was named after American Olympic head coach Herb Brooks. Orpik (as well as his brother Andrew) grew up in Amherst, New York. Orpik attended the Nichols School in Buffalo and Thayer Academy in Braintree, Massachusetts.

Playing career

College
Orpik played three seasons at Boston College for the Eagles ice hockey team, winning the Hockey East playoff championship in 1999 and 2001, as well as the NCAA Men's Ice Hockey Championship in 2001. His younger brother Andrew was also a hockey player, playing for Boston College and having a brief minor league career.

Professional

Pittsburgh Penguins (2001–2014)
Orpik was drafted in the first round, 18th overall, of the 2000 NHL Entry Draft by the Pittsburgh Penguins. He began his professional career with the Wilkes-Barre/Scranton Penguins of the American Hockey League (AHL) during the 2001–02 season. He made his NHL debut during the 2002–03 season, playing in six games and recording no points. After earning a permanent roster spot on the team the next year, Orpik played in 79 games, registering one goal, nine assists and 127 penalty minutes.

On March 4, 2006, Orpik boarded Carolina Hurricanes forward Erik Cole, fracturing a vertebra in Cole's neck. Orpik was suspended three games for the illegal hit. Cole did not return until Game 6 of the 2006 Stanley Cup Finals.

In the summer of 2008, Orpik signed a new six-year, $22.5 million contract with the Penguins. In October 2008, he was named an alternate captain (interim while Sergei Gonchar was injured) of the Penguins, along with Evgeni Malkin, behind captain Sidney Crosby.

On June 12, 2009, Orpik and the Penguins became Stanley Cup champions by defeating the Detroit Red Wings in Game 7 of the 2009 Stanley Cup Finals. He was the first native of California to win the Stanley Cup.

On December 17, 2011, Orpik recorded his 100th career point by earning an assist on Evgeni Malkin's goal on Ryan Miller at Consol Energy Center in Pittsburgh.

On May 11, 2013, Orpik scored the game-winning goal in overtime of Game 6 to eliminate the New York Islanders and advance Pittsburgh to the second round of the 2013 Stanley Cup playoffs; it was his first career Stanley Cup playoff goal.

On December 7, 2013, Orpik hit Boston Bruins forward Loui Eriksson, resulting in a concussion to the latter. While Orpik lay on the ice due to a confrontation with a Bruins player, Shawn Thornton delivered a punch that concussed Orpik; Thornton was suspended 15 games for the incident.

Washington Capitals (2014–2019)
On July 1, 2014, the Washington Capitals signed Orpik to a five-year, $27.5 million contract as an unrestricted free agent.

In Game 2 of Washington's 2016 playoff series against the Pittsburgh Penguins, Orpik delivered an illegal and late hit to Pittsburgh defenseman Olli Määttä, making contact with Määttä's head. Orpik was suspended three games for the late hit and Määttä returned a few games later to finish, and help win, the series.

On April 23, 2018, during his fourth season with the Capitals, in 2017–18, Orpik was Washington's nomination for the King Clancy Memorial Trophy as a player who best exemplifies leadership qualities and gives back to his community. In the 2018 playoffs, on May 30, 2018, Orpik scored the game-winning goal in Game 2 of the 2018 Stanley Cup Finals against the Vegas Golden Knights. It was also the first time Orpik had scored a goal since February 20, 2016. On June 7, 2018, Orpik and the Capitals went on to win the Stanley Cup against the Golden Knights in five games. This was the first Stanley Cup for the Capitals and the second finals victory for Orpik.

On June 22, 2018, less than three weeks after winning the Stanley Cup for the second time, and due to salary cap considerations, Orpik was traded by the Capitals to the Colorado Avalanche (alongside goaltender Philipp Grubauer) in exchange for Colorado's second-round pick in the 2018 NHL Entry Draft. He was immediately informed by Avalanche general manager Joe Sakic that he would be moved to a preferred destination or bought-out from the remaining year of the five-year contract he had initially signed with Washington. He was placed on unconditional waivers the following day and on June 24, he was released to free agency. On July 24, he signed a one-year, $1 million contract to return to Washington.

Orpik scored the overtime game-winning goal in Game 2 of Washington's opening round 2019 playoff series against the Carolina Hurricanes, giving the Capitals a 2–0 series lead. This would be Orpik's last NHL goal. Despite this, the Capitals attempt at a Cup repeat would fall short as the Hurricanes went onto eliminate the Capitals in seven games.

On June 25, 2019, Orpik announced his retirement from professional hockey. Soon after retiring, the Capitals hired Orpik as a Player Development coach.

International play

In 1999, Orpik competed for the United States in the World Junior Ice Hockey Championships in Stockholm.

In 2009, Orpik was invited to the USA Hockey orientation camp, from August 17 to 19, in preparation for the 2010 Winter Olympics in Vancouver. Orpik was ultimately selected to the American team, which finished with a silver medal finish behind Canada.

Personal life
He is married to Erin Orpik, with whom he has two daughters.

Career statistics

Regular season and playoffs

International

Awards and honors

References

External links 

 

1980 births
Living people
American men's ice hockey defensemen
Boston College Eagles men's ice hockey players
Ice hockey players at the 2010 Winter Olympics
Ice hockey players at the 2014 Winter Olympics
Ice hockey people from Buffalo, New York
Ice hockey players from California
Medalists at the 2010 Winter Olympics
National Hockey League first-round draft picks
NCAA men's ice hockey national champions
Olympic silver medalists for the United States in ice hockey
Pittsburgh Penguins draft picks
Pittsburgh Penguins players
Sportspeople from San Francisco
Stanley Cup champions
Thayer Academy alumni
Washington Capitals players
Wilkes-Barre/Scranton Penguins players